This is a list of town tramway systems in Italy by region. It includes all tram systems in Italy, past and present; cities with current operating systems, and those systems themselves, are indicated in bold and blue background colored rows. The use of the diamond (♦) symbol indicates where there were (or are) two or more independent tram systems operating concurrently within a single metropolitan area. Those tram systems that operated on other than standard gauge track (where known) are indicated in the 'Notes' column.

History of the openings of Italian tramways

History of currently existing tramway systems in Italy

Abruzzo

Apulia (Puglia)

Calabria

Campania

Emilia-Romagna

Friuli-Venezia Giulia

Lazio

Liguria

Lombardy (Lombardia)

The Marches (Marche)

Piedmont (Piemonte)

Sardinia (Sardegna)

Sicily (Sicilia)

Tuscany (Toscana)

Trentino-Alto Adige/Südtirol

Umbria

Veneto

See also
List of town tramway systems in Europe
List of trolleybus systems in Italy
List of tram and light rail transit systems
List of metro systems

References

Bibliography
Books and periodicals shown in List of town tramway systems

Tramways
Italy